The 2021–22 Syracuse Orange men's basketball team represented Syracuse University during the 2021–22 NCAA Division I men's basketball season. The Orange were led by 46th-year head coach Jim Boeheim and played their home games at the Carrier Dome in Syracuse, New York as ninth-year members of the Atlantic Coast Conference.

The Orange finished the season 16–17 overall and 9–11 in ACC play to finish in ninth place.  As the ninth seed in the ACC tournament, they defeated eighth seed Florida State in the Second Round before losing to first seed Duke in the Quarterfinals.  They were not invited to the NCAA tournament or the NIT.

Previous season
The Orange finished the 2020–21 season 18–10, 9–7 in ACC play, to finish in eight place.  In the ACC tournament, they defeated NC State in the Second Round before losing to Virginia in the Quarterfinals.  They received an at-large bid to the NCAA tournament as an eleven seed in the Midwest Region.  In the tournament, they defeated six seed San Diego State in the First Round and three seed West Virginia in the Second Round, before losing to two seed Houston in the Sweet Sixteen.

Offseason

Departures

Incoming transfers

Source:

2021 recruiting class

Source:

2022 Recruiting class

Roster

Schedule and results

Source:

|-
!colspan=12 style=| Exhibition

|-
!colspan=12 style=| Regular Season

|-
!colspan=12 style=| ACC Tournament

Rankings

*AP does not release post-NCAA Tournament rankings^Coaches did not release a Week 2 poll.

References

Syracuse Orange men's basketball seasons
Syracuse
Syracuse basketball, men
Syracuse basketball, men